The Lancashire bagpipe or Lancashire greatpipe has been attested in literature, and commentators have noticed that the Lancashire bagpipe was also believed proof against witchcraft.

Historical attestation
 In James Shirley's 1634 masque, The Triumph of Peace, the procession to Whitehall was led by Thomas Basset on horseback, playing the Lancashire bagpipe.
Aphra Behn's Sir Patient Fancy (1678) mentions:  "Not so joyful neither Sir, when you shall know Poor  Gillian 's dead, My little gray Mare, thou knew'st her mun, Zoz 'thas made me as Melancholy as the Drone of a Lancashire Bagpipe"
Ralph Thoresby, a topographer, wrote in 1702:  "got little rest, the music and Lancashire bagpipes having continued the whole night."

▪       Cervantes, Don Quixote, translated by P.A Motteux (1712)
(Explains), Zamora is a city in Spain, famous for that sort of music, as Lancashire is in England for the bagpipe.

Further reading
The Bagpipe in Northern England. R. D. Cannon. Folk Music Journal, Vol. 2, No. 2 (1971), pp. 127–147
James Merryweather Regional Bagipes: History or Bunk?

References

See also 
 List of bagpipes
 List of bagpipers
 List of pipe makers
 Glossary of bagpipe terms

Culture in Lancashire
Bagpipes
English musical instruments